The 1997 Tennessee Volunteers football team represented the University of Tennessee during the 1997 NCAA Division I-A football season.  Quarterback Peyton Manning had already completed his degree in three years, and had been projected to be the top overall pick in the 1997 NFL Draft, but returned to Tennessee for his senior year. The Volunteers opened the season with victories against Texas Tech and UCLA, but for the third time in his career, Manning fell to Florida, 33–20. The Vols won the rest of their regular season games, finishing 10–1, and advanced to the SEC Championship Game against Auburn. Down 20–7, Manning led the Vols to a 30–29 victory. Throwing for four touchdowns, he was named the game's MVP, but injured himself in the process. The #3 Vols were matched up with #2 Nebraska in the Orange Bowl. Had Tennessee won and top-ranked Michigan lost to Washington State in the Rose Bowl, the Vols would have been expected to win the national championship. However, the Vols' defense could not stop Nebraska's rushing attack, giving up more than 400 yards on the ground in a 42–17 loss. As a senior, Manning won numerous awards.  He was a consensus first-team All-American and won the Maxwell Award, the Davey O'Brien Award, the Johnny Unitas Award, and the Best College Football Player ESPY Award, among others.  However, he did not win the Heisman Trophy, finishing runner-up to Charles Woodson, a CB from Michigan, and the only defensive player ever to win the Heisman Trophy.

Schedule

Rankings

Personnel

Game summaries

Texas Tech

Source: Box score

at UCLA

Source: Box score

at Florida

Ole Miss

Source: Box score

Georgia

Source: Box score

at Alabama

Source: Box score

South Carolina

Source: Box score

Southern Miss

Source: Box score

at Arkansas

Source: Box score

at Kentucky

Source: Box score

Peyton Manning threw for a school-record 523 yards and tied the school-record with 5 passing touchdowns in this high-scoring win over Kentucky. The single-game TD record fell in 2007 and the single-game yardage record stood until 2012. In all, Manning and Kentucky QB Tim Couch combined for 999 passing yards (Couch threw for a then-school-record 476 yards).

Vanderbilt

vs. Auburn

Source: Box score
    
    
    
    
    
    
    
    
    
    
    

The Vols struck first just over two minutes into the game, but found themselves trailing 20–7 only 48 seconds into the second quarter. Despite six turnovers, Tennessee clawed all the way back. Peyton Manning threw for 373 yards and 4 TD, including a game winning 73-yard touchdown to Marcus Nash.

vs. Nebraska (Orange Bowl)

Awards and honors
Peyton Manning, consensus first-team All-American
Peyton Manning, Maxwell Award winner
Peyton Manning, Davey O'Brien Award winner
Peyton Manning, James E. Sullivan Award
Peyton Manning, Johnny Unitas Award winner
Peyton Manning, Best College Football Player ESPY Award winner
Peyton Manning, runner-up, Heisman Trophy

Team players drafted into the NFL

References:

References

Tennessee
Tennessee Volunteers football seasons
Southeastern Conference football champion seasons
Tennessee Volunteers football